Aranimermis giganteus is the largest known species of Mermithidae and often infects the mygalomorph spiders of New Zealand.

Taxonomy 
Aranimermis giganteus was described in 1990 from samples collected from parasitized spiders caught in traps.

References 

Mermithidae
Nematodes described in 1990